Clandonald is a hamlet in central Alberta, Canada within the County of Vermilion River.

The hamlet takes its name from Clan Donald, a Highland Scottish clan.

Demographics 

See also 
List of communities in Alberta
List of designated places in Alberta
List of hamlets in Alberta

References 

Hamlets in Alberta
Designated places in Alberta
County of Vermilion River